Chang: A Drama of the Wilderness, also known simply as Chang (from Thai ช้าง, "elephant") is a silent film about a poor farmer in northern Nan Province (northern Thailand) and his daily struggle for survival in the jungle. The film was directed by Merian C. Cooper and Ernest B. Schoedsack. It was released by Famous Players-Lasky, a division of Paramount Pictures.

Plot
Kru, the farmer depicted in the film, battles leopards, tigers, and even a herd of elephants, all of which pose a constant threat to his livelihood. As filmmakers, Cooper and Schoedsack attempted to capture real life with their cameras, though they often re-staged events that had not been captured adequately on film. The danger was real to all the people and animals involved. Tigers, leopards, and bears are slaughtered on camera, while the film's climax shows Kru's house being demolished by a stampeding elephant.

Release

Home media
Chang was released for the first time on DVD by Image Entertainment on November 21, 2000. Milestone Video would release the film on VHS and on DVD on January 8, 2002 and October 29, 2013, respectively.

Reception
Chang was one of the "biggest movies of 1928".

Author and film critic Leonard Maltin awarded the film three and a half of four stars, calling the film "[a] fascinating ethnographic documentary/narrative". Mordaunt Hall from The New York Times praised the film,  calling it "vivid and thrilling".

Awards
Chang was nominated for the Academy Award for Unique and Artistic Production at the first Academy Awards in 1929, the only time that award was presented.

See also
 List of films shot in Thailand

References

External links

1927 films
American documentary films
American silent feature films
American black-and-white films
Ethnofiction films
Films directed by Ernest B. Schoedsack
Films directed by Merian C. Cooper
Paramount Pictures films
1927 documentary films
Black-and-white documentary films
Thai national heritage films
1920s American films
1920s English-language films